This article contains information about the literary events and publications of 1640.

Events
January 21 – Salmacida Spolia, a masque written by Sir William Davenant and designed by Inigo Jones, is performed at Whitehall Palace. It is the final royal masque of the Caroline era.
March 17 (St. Patrick's Day) – Henry Burnell's play Landgartha is first performed, at the Werburgh Street Theatre in Dublin. It is one of the earliest plays from a native Irish playwright.
c. April 16 – James Shirley returns to England from Ireland.
May 4 – Theatre manager William Beeston is sent to the Marshalsea Prison for staging a play (possibly Richard Brome's The Court Beggar or his The Queen and Concubine) which offends the Stuart regime. This constitutes the only repression of the theatre to occur during the reign of King Charles I.
May 28 – Pedro Calderón de la Barca joins the Catalan campaign led by the Duke of Olivares.
English Cavalier poet Richard Lovelace, serving in the Bishops' Wars in Scotland, writes "To Lucasta, Going to the Warres" (published 1649) and the unperformed tragedy The Soldier (lost).

New books
The Bay Psalm Book, the first book printed in North America
Uriel da Costa – Exemplar Humanae Vitae
Diego de Saavedra Fajardo – Idea de un príncipe político cristiano (literally, "The Idea of a Christian Political Prince;" in English, The Royal Politician)
Thomas Fuller – Joseph's coloured Coat
James Howell – Dodona's Grove
Cornelius Jansen – Augustinus
Thomas Stephens – Arte da lingoa Canarim, a grammar of the Konkani language
John Wilkins – A Discourse Concerning a New Planet
Francisco de Rioja – Aristarco o censura de la proclamación católica de los catalanes
Baltasar Gracián – El político Don Fernando el Católico
Juan Eusebio Nieremberg – De la diferencia entre lo temporal y lo eterno. Crisol de desengaño

New drama
Henry Burnell – Landgartha
Pierre Corneille – Horace
William Davenant – Salmacida Spolia
John Fletcher & James Shirley – The Night Walker (published)
Henry Glapthorne – The Hollander, Wit in a Constable, and The Ladies' Privilege (published)
John Gough – The Strange Discovery
William Habington – The Queen of Arragon
Samuel Harding – Sicily and Naples
Jean Mairet – L’Illustre corsaire
Nathaniel Richards – Messalina (published)
Joseph Rutter- The Cid, Part 2 (published)
George Sandys –  Christ's Passion (English translation of Hugo Grotius's Christus Patiens)
Lewis Sharpe – The Noble Stranger published
James Shirley – The Imposture performed; a single-volume collection of eight plays published; The Arcadia, The Humorous Courtier, and Saint Patrick for Ireland published; The Coronation published but misattributed to John Fletcher
Francisco de Rojas Zorrilla – Los bandos de Verona
Pedro Calderón de la Barca – Psiquis y Cupido
Valentín de Céspedes – Las glorias del mejor siglo
Lope de Vega – Parte XXIV de comedias
 Entremeses nuevos
Fray Alonso Remón – Las tres mujeres en una
Francisco de Rojas Zorrilla 
Donde hay agravios no hay celos
No hay amigo para amigo
Progne y Filomena

Poetry
Thomas Carew – Poems
Robert Sempill the younger – The Life and Death of Habbie Simpson, Piper of Kilbarchan
John Tatham – Fancy's Theatre
Romances varios de diversos autores

Births
April 2 – Marianna Alcoforado, Portuguese nun and purported letter-writer (died 1723)
June 5 – Pu Songling (蒲松龄), Chinese writer (died 1715)
August 8 – Amalia Catharina, German poet (died 1697)
September 6 – Heinrich Brewer, German historian (died c. 1713)
December 6 – Claude Fleury, French historian (died 1723)
December 14 (baptized) – Aphra Behn (Eaffrey Johnson), English dramatist (died 1689)

Uncertain dates
David-Augustin de Brueys, French theologian and dramatist (died 1723)
Madame de Villedieu, French dramatist and novelist (died 1683)

Deaths
January 25 – Robert Burton, English scholar (born 1577)
February/March – Richard Rowlands, English antiquary (born c. 1550)
March 8 (burial) – Samuel Ward, English Puritan preacher and writer (born 1577)
March 17 – Philip Massinger, English dramatist (born 1583)
March 22 – Thomas Carew, English poet (born 1595)
April – Uriel da Costa, Portuguese philosopher (born c. 1585)
April 2 – Paul Fleming, German poet (born 1609)
April 28 (burial) – William Alabaster, English poet and playwright (born 1567)
May 30 – André Duchesne, French historian (born 1584)
October 1 – Claudio Achillini, Italian philosopher and poet (born 1574)
December
William Aspley, English publisher (born c. 1573)
Sir John Melton, English politician and writer (unknown year of birth)
unknown dates
Charles Aleyn, English poet (unknown year of birth)
Daniel Naborowski, Polish Baroque poet (born 1573)
probable – Elizabeth Melville, Scottish poet (born c. 1578)

References

 
Years of the 17th century in literature